USS Dane (APA-238) was a  in service with the United States Navy from 1945 to 1946. She was scrapped in 1975.

History
Dane was named after a county in Wisconsin. She was launched on 9 August 1945 by Oregon Shipbuilding of Portland, Oregon, under a Maritime Commission contract; transferred to the Navy 29 October 1945; and commissioned the same day.

Dane arrived too late too see action in World War II, but she arrived in time to participate in Operation Magic Carpet, the massive sealift made shortly after the war to bring returning servicemen home.

Dane made three "Magic Carpet" voyages to the West Pacific from 29 December 1945 to 10 July 1946, bringing home veterans from Okinawa, Guam, Peleliu, Manus, Truk, and Kwajalein.

Decommissioning
She remained at San Francisco until placed out of commission 20 December 1946. She was transferred to the Maritime Administration 17 August 1958, which disposed of her some time thereafter. Her final disposition is unknown.

References

 APA-238 Dane, Navsource Online.

Haskell-class attack transports
Dane County, Wisconsin
World War II amphibious warfare vessels of the United States
Ships built in Portland, Oregon
1945 ships